Mammoth is a water coaster at Holiday World & Splashin' Safari in Santa Claus, Indiana, United States. It was designed and built beginning in 2011 by ProSlide Technology; it opened on May 11, 2012. Mammoth is named after the mammoth, a now-extinct prehistoric mammal, keeping with the water park's safari theme.

History
On August 3, 2011, Holiday World & Splashin' Safari announced Mammoth, a ProSlide HydroMagnetic Mammoth that was to be built to the east of Wildebeest. Unlike Wildebeest, which uses 4-passenger, toboggan-style boats, Mammoth was to use round, 6-passenger boats. Another unique feature of Mammoth is its length.

Mammoth opened on May 11, 2012. When the HydroMagnetic water coaster opened, it operated with ten 6-passenger boats. The riders in the 6-passenger "round spinner" boats are seated in a circle facing each other; when it opened, Mammoth was the only water coaster to utilize this type of boat.

Characteristics

Boats
Mammoth uses a total of ten yellow, 6-passenger boats called "round spinners". In each of the round spinners, riders are seated in a circle facing each other. Each seat has individual seat backs and two handles to hold on with, one on the rider's left and one on the rider's right. To allow the linear induction motors to interact with the boats and propel them uphill, a magnetic metal plate is attached to the underside of every boat.

Track
The track on Mammoth is made out of numerous pieces of molded, red, yellow, and blue fiberglass supported by concrete pillars. The track features a conveyor belt lift hill as well as six linear induction motors that propel the boats back uphill, including the longest LIM on a water coaster.

LIM technology
The technology on HydroMagnetic Rockets utilizes linear induction motors (LIMs) to propel boats uphill. An alternating magnetic field beneath the slide surface interacts with a steel plate mounted on the underside of each boat to push them uphill smoothly and quickly. Because the magnetic field under the slide surface needs power in order to be activated, boats will not be able to make it uphill in the case of a power outage. In that case, all of the boats throughout the course will roll back, causing each boat to valley at the bottom of a hill. LIM technology is commonly used on launched roller coasters.

Experience
The total ride experience on Mammoth lasts approximately three minutes.

Dispatch to Third Drop
The ride begins with riders facing away from Bakuli. After dispatch, the boat travels up a slight incline where it waits until there is adequate spacing between it and the boat in front of it. When the ride's system has determined there is adequate spacing between the boats, the boat moves forward and onto the conveyor belt lift hill. While on the lift hill, riders will pass under one of the ride's drops and over two of its inclines. At the top of the lift hill, the boat moves from the conveyor belt onto the fiberglass. At this point the boat makes a right turn before entering the ride's initial  drop at a 45° angle. Following the descent, the boat is rocketed back uphill by the first of six linear induction motors. The boat crests the hill and makes a left turn, in preparation for a dropping, right-hand, hairpin turn. At the bottom of the dropping hairpin turn, the boat is sent uphill for a second time before making another descent.

Third Drop to End
At the bottom of the third drop the boat passes under the lift hill and is launched uphill a third time. The boat turns left before it drops down under the lift hill. At this point the boat glides uphill and into a left-hand, 270° turn. The boat then travels downhill before going back uphill, this time over the lift hill. After going down hill and uphill one more time, the boat enters a right-turning helix. Once the boat has navigated the helix, it makes a left turn before dropping a final time. At the conclusion of the drop it lands in a splash pool of water, floating in a current with mild rapids for several yards before making a left turn to line up with the end-of-the-ride conveyor belt. The final conveyor belt brings the boat into the station, at which time riders unload.

Operation
Mammoth operates with water and in heavily wooded areas. Due to these factors, Mammoth closes when there is lightning or high wind in Holiday World's immediate area.

In addition to weather conditions, some riders may be prohibited from boarding. Due to these restrictions, some riders may be required to split up. All riders must abide by Splashin' Safari's dress code, which includes wearing modest swimwear or clothing, in order to ride. In addition, riders must leave all loose items in the station; riders who refuse to leave their loose items in the station will not be permitted to ride.

Each year, Holiday World & Splashin' Safari, in coordination with the Easter Seals Rehabilitation Center of Southwestern Indiana, publishes an accessibility guide for guests with disabilities. It is recommended, though not necessarily required, that all guests with the following conditions refrain from riding Mammoth:
Back, Neck, or Bone Injury
Heart Trouble
High Blood Pressure
Pregnancy
Recent Surgery or Illness

Awards and records
Mammoth was voted the world's "Best New Waterpark Ride" at the 2012 Golden Ticket Awards.

See also
 2012 in amusement parks

References

External links
Official website for Mammoth at Holiday World & Splashin' Safari
Official YouTube video animation of Mammoth posted by Holiday World & Splashin' Safari

Holiday World & Splashin' Safari
Amusement rides introduced in 2012
Water rides